Theoretical oxygen demand (ThOD) is the calculated amount of oxygen required to oxidize a compound to its final oxidation products. However, there are  some differences between standard methods that can influence the results obtained: for example, some calculations assume that nitrogen released from organic compounds is generated as ammonia, whereas others allow for ammonia oxidation to nitrate. Therefore, in expressing results, the calculation assumptions should always be stated.

In order to determine the  ThOD for glycine (CH2(NH2)COOH) using the following assumptions:

In the first step, the organic carbon and nitrogen are  converted to carbon dioxide (CO2) and ammonia  (NH3), respectively.
In the second and third steps, the ammonia is  oxidized sequentially to nitrite and nitrate. 
The ThOD is the sum of the oxygen required for all three steps.

We can calculate by following steps:
Write balanced reaction for the carbonaceous oxygen demand.CH2(NH2)COOH + 1.5O2 → NH3 + 2CO2 + H2O
Write balanced reactions for the nitrogenous oxygen demand.NH3 + 1.5O2 → HNO2 + H2O HNO2 + 0.5O2 → HNO3NH3 + 2O2 → HNO3 + H2O
Determine the ThOD.ThOD = (1.5 + 2) mol O2/mol glycine= 3.5 mol O2/mol glycine × 32 g/mol O2 / 75 g/mol glycine= 1.49 g O2/g glycine

The theoretical oxygen demand represents the worst-case scenario. The actual oxygen demand of any compound depends on the biodegradability of the compound and the specific organism metabolizing the compound. The actual oxygen demand can be measured experimentally and is called the biochemical oxygen demand (BOD).

See also
 Biological oxygen demand
 Chemical oxygen demand
 Carbonaceous biochemical oxygen demand

References

Environmental chemistry
Water quality indicators